The Chicago Music Exchange is a music equipment retailer based in Chicago, Illinois, United States. Located at 3316 North Lincoln Avenue, CME is known for its museum-like showroom and collection of vintage guitars and basses. It is a major Chicago destination for musicians.

History
CME was founded in 1990 by Scott Silver who moved the store from 3270 N. Clark St to its current location in 2005. A major player in the global vintage guitar market, Chicago Music Exchange took an active role in vintage guitar boom of the mid to late-2000s.

The business and its inventory of instruments was purchased by David Kalt in 2010 for $7.5 million. Since then, the store has added a full drum shop as well as a dedicated bass room ("The Bassment") which opened in 2013. CME has also rapidly expanded its online presence and sales, and is known for its active YouTube channel featuring product demos of new pedals and vintage pieces.

In June 2012, CME posted a video entitled "100 Riffs" which went viral following a stint on the front page of Reddit.

In 2013, Kalt launched Reverb.com as an open marketplace to buy and sell music gear.

Notable customers
Chicago Music Exchange has hosted many celebrity customers including:

 Adele
 Billie Joe Armstrong
 Billy Corgan
 Black Keys
 Bill Kelliher
 Brad Paisley
 Brian Blade
 Butch Walker
 Cage the Elephant
 Camera Obscura
 Carlos Santana
 Dweezil Zappa
 Dawes
 Eddie Vedder
 Ethan Farmer
 Fall Out Boy
 Foxygen
 Gotye
 Imagine Dragons
 J Mascis
 Jeff Tweedy
 Joe Bonamassa
 John Depp
 Karen O
 The Lumineers
 Marcus Mumford
 Mastodon
 Melissa Etheridge
 Metz
 Neon Trees
 Of Monsters & Men
 Omar Rodríguez-López
 OneRepublic
 Red Hot Chili Peppers
 Limp Bizkit
 Rick Nielsen
 Russian Circles
 Sleeping With Sirens
 Social Distortion
 Steve Miller
 Sting
 Tame Impala
 The War on Drugs
 Tom Petty
 Will Champlin
 Zac Brown

References

External links 
 Chicago Music Exchange Website
 Chicago Music Exchange YouTube Channel

Musical instrument retailers of the United States
Buildings and structures in Chicago